Founded in Upstate New York in 1978 by Maureen Brady and Judith McDaniel, Spinsters Ink is one of the oldest lesbian feminist publishers in the world. It is currently owned by publisher Linda Hill, who purchased the Spinsters Ink in 2005. Hill also owns Bella Books and Beanpole Books.

History

Spinsters Ink was founded by Brady and McDaniel and moved to San Francisco in 1982, where it was purchased by Sherry Thomas.

In 1980, Spinsters Ink released a call to readers and bookstores in Feminist Bookstores Newsletter seeking donations to fund the release of the press's next two titles, The Cancer Journals by Audre Lourde and Lynn Strongin's first novel Bones & Kim. The call for donations succeeded and both books were published.

The early history of Spinsters Ink is closely tied up with that of another feminist publisher, Aunt Lute Books. Spinsters Ink merged in San Francisco with Aunt Lute Book Company in 1986, to form Spinsters/Aunt Lute. The Aunt Lute Foundation was established as a non profit publishing program in 1990, and the two companies separated again. In 1992 Spinsters Ink was purchased by lesbian feminist philanthropist Joan Drury and moved to Minneapolis.

In 2001 Spinsters Ink moved to Denver, Colorado, under Sharon Silvas, who brought back into print the classic feminist utopian novel, The Wanderground by Sally Miller Gearhart. The press is currently owned by Linda Hill, and employs Katherine V. Forrest as editorial supervisor.

Titles
Spinsters Ink has published many well-known women authors, including Sheila Ortiz-Taylor, Minnie Bruce Pratt, Paula Gunn Allen, Elana Dykewomon, Judy Grahn, Audre Lorde, Gloria Anzaldúa, Val McDermid, and Cherríe Moraga. It has released several Lambda Literary Award winning books, such as Why Can't Sharon Kowalski Come Home?, Two-Bit Tango, and Cancer in Two Voices, as well as the bestselling Look Me in the Eye: Old Women, Aging and Ageism. It received a Publisher Service Award from the Lambda Literary Foundation. In 2012, When We Were Outlaws: A Memoir of Love and Revolution by Jeanne Cordova won the Publishing Triangle Judy Grahn Award for Lesbian Memoir.

Current writers include Lambda Literary Award winners Julia Watts and Katherine V. Forrest. Sheila Ortiz-Taylor continues to publish with Spinsters Ink. Its current catalog includes general, dramatic and genre fiction for women and lesbians.

References

External links
 Spinsters Ink

Book publishing companies based in Florida
Feminist book publishing companies
Feminist organizations in the United States
Lesbian culture in New York (state)
Lesbian feminist literature
Lesbian organizations in the United States
Publishing companies established in 1978
LGBT in New York (state)
Feminism in New York (state)